Euxoa bicollaris is a moth of the family Noctuidae. It is found from British Columbia, south to California.

The wingspan is about 32 mm.

References

Euxoa
Moths of North America
Moths described in 1878